Claire Goose (born 10 February 1975) is a British actress. She played Tina Seabrook, a nurse in BBC One's Casualty, DS Mel Silver in Waking the Dead, and Sergeant (later Inspector) Rachel Weston in ITV's The Bill. She also narrated the last two series of Road Wars for digital satellite channel Sky 1 in 2009 and 2010.

In 2015 she took the part of the leading character in BBC Birmingham's series The Coroner.

Early life
Born in Edinburgh, Goose was raised in Dersingham, England, where her father worked as a general practitioner. She has an elder sister, Caroline, a nursery nurse, and an elder brother, Duncan,  who started the One Drinks company. Goose is a former pupil of Wisbech Grammar School and a graduate of the Italia Conti Academy of Theatre Arts.

Personal life
In the 1990s Goose dated her Casualty co-star, Jonathan Kerrigan. In 2007 she married TV producer Craig Woodrow. Together they have two daughters, Amelia and Eveline.

Career
Early theatre roles included Addicted to Love, and Hitting Home at the Man in the Moon Theatre. She also appeared in early adverts for Impulse women's body spray.

She became well known during the late 1990s as nurse Tina Seabrook in Casualty. From August 2008, she played Sergeant, later Inspector Rachel Weston in ITV's The Bill.

In 2011 she appeared in BBC1 drama Exile with John Simm, and in 2015 appeared in the fourth series of Death in Paradise.

From 2015 she starred as the titular character in the BBC Birmingham daytime drama The Coroner, set in the fictional coastal town of Lighthaven in South Devon. The series ran to 20 episodes. The BBC announced on 2 March 2017 that there would be no further series.

In 2019, she played the lead role of Thea in "The Girl Who Fell" by Sarah Rutherford at Trafalgar Studios.

Awards

Filmography

References

External links
 

1975 births
Alumni of the Italia Conti Academy of Theatre Arts
English television actresses
Living people
Anglo-Scots
Actresses from Edinburgh
People from Dersingham
People educated at Wisbech Grammar School